Chad Veach is an American evangelical pastor and the founder of Zoe Church, a youth-oriented Christian congregation that is based in Los Angeles, California. Veach has been the subject of significant mainstream press coverage, which often focuses on Veach’s taste in streetwear and sneakers and his links to celebrities like actor Chris Pratt, Kardashians and singer Justin Bieber, which have been chronicled on Veach’s Instagram.

Early life and family
Veach was born in 1979. Veach grew up on Whidbey Island, Washington. His father, Dave Veach, is a District Supervisor with Foursquare Church in Tacoma, Washington. Growing up he attended Shelton Christian Fellowship (now called Gateway Christian Fellowship), as his parents were youth pastors there. As a young man, Veach “wasn’t solid in his faith at all,” according to his father. In an interview with The Christian Post, Veach said that he had "a foot in, a foot out" of church as a teenager, but that attending a Promise Keepers event was a turning point for him: "it's the typical prodigal son story who has an experience and then says, 'Wait, what I had back home was way better. I'm going back home and to church.' I had sown some wild oats but nothing too crazy." Veach’s two siblings are also pastors.

Veach attended Life Pacific College, a Foursquare denominational Bible college located in San Dimas, California, graduating in 2002.

Career
Veach started as a youth pastor in El Monte, California. In 2004, Veach took a job counseling teens and young adults for United Generation ministry in Puyallup, Washington. In 2013, he became associated with Judah Smith, spiritual adviser to Justin Bieber and lead pastor of Churchome, a multi-site megachurch based in Seattle and Los Angeles. 

In 2014, Chad Veach and his wife Julia Veach moved to Los Angeles and started their ministry with informal gatherings at their home. Zoe Church began its services in borrowed space in a small church in Santa Monica and, after one day at the 1 Oak nightclub in Hollywood.  Zoe Church had services at the Fonda nightclub. Zoe Church moved to the El Rey Theatre on Wilshire Boulevard. Services were also held at the Million Dollar Theater in downtown Los Angeles. Veach told the New York Times that he modeled Zoe Church after Hillsong Church and Church of the Highlands.

In 2017, Veach and Judah Smith accompanied Justin Bieber on his Purpose World Tour, reportedly to serve as “positive influences.” Videos of Veach hanging out with Justin Bieber have appeared on Veach’s Instagram account.

Ruth Graham, writing in Slate, noted how Veach’s “on-trend streetwear and friendship with Justin Bieber” made him the latest example of the “cool-pastor phenomenon.” Describing Veach as an “Instagram-savvy pastor ... who dresses not like Ward Cleaver, but like a Supreme model,” Graham observed that “Veach and his cohort seem to have converted as many style writers as they have souls.”

In August 2022, Zoe Church bought the 98 year old Buddhist Temple in Highland Park for their future church site.

Pastoral style

In a profile of Veach published in The New York Times, Veach was quoted as saying "I want to be loud and dumb. That's my goal. If we aren't making people laugh, what are we doing? What's the point?" Veach is described as frequently using street talk, Spanish bilingualism and changing his dialect depending on his audience, and occasionally mimicking Houston megachurch pastor Joel Osteen and Word of Faith ministers.  Veach teaches Word of Faith prosperity doctrine and places a huge emphasis on giving money to God through the church. Veach maintains an active social media presence, crediting Instagram with helping to popularize his church.

Veach described his pastoral philosophy in an interview with The Christian Post, saying that he was motivated by a desire to reverse the trend of young adults becoming less affiliated with church:We need to do whatever we can to become relevant and deconstruct some of those false notions about what religion is. What resonates with young adults is actually the message of Jesus and maybe that was convoluted or placed in the back burner in the past but I think that's why you're seeing young adults in the droves respond because if people can see a clear picture of Jesus, that undeniable ... we obviously have something better than the world can offer."

Books
Veach has published five books.

In 2012, Veach's first book, Do You See What I See? was published.

In 2016, Veach’s second book, Unreasonable Hope: Finding Faith in the God Who Brings Purpose to Your Pain, was published, about his daughter Georgia’s struggle with lissencephaly.

In 2017, Veach’s third book, Faith Forward Future: Moving Past Your Disappointments, Delays, and Destructive Thinking was published.

In 2020, Veach’s fourth book, Help! I Work with People: Getting Good at Influence, Leadership, and People Skills was published.

In 2022, Veach’s fifth book, Pray About Everything Devotional Journal was published.

Personal life
Veach is married to the former Julia MacGregor. The couple has four children.

Veach has a tattoo on his left arm that reads “Better at 70,” in the handwriting of Justin Bieber.

Controversy
Veach's church has been criticized by actor Elliot Page for being "infamously anti-LGBTQ". Actor Chris Pratt spoke on the matter, denying the anti-LGBTQ stance and saying that the Zoe Church "opens its doors to absolutely everyone".

Veach and his wife Julia were executive producers on the 2017 film The Heart of Man- a docudrama on sexual brokenness which aligns same-sex attraction with porn addiction and infidelity.

Veach was associated with the controversial church Hillsong by attending and speaking at Hillsong conferences. Veach was close friends with Hillsong's pastor, Carl Lentz.

References

External links 
 Chad Veach's Instagram
 Zoe Church website

Sources

 
 
 
 
 
 
 
 

Living people
American evangelicals
American Christian writers
Religious leaders from California
Year of birth missing (living people)